Ivan Simeonov (October 23, 1926 – December 2018) was a Bulgarian sprint canoer who competed in the early 1960s. He was eliminated in the repechages of the K-2 1000 m event at the 1960 Summer Olympics in Rome.

References

Sports-reference.com profile

1926 births
2018 deaths
Bulgarian male canoeists
Canoeists at the 1960 Summer Olympics
Olympic canoeists of Bulgaria